Fusa may refer to:

Places
 Fusa, a former municipality in the old Hordaland county, Norway
 Fusa (village), a village in Bjørnafjorden municipality in Vestland county, Norway
 Fusa Church, a church in Bjørnafjorden municipality in Vestland county, Norway
 Fusa, the commonly used name for the Colombian town of Fusagasugá
 Fusa or Fussa, a town in Tokyo, Japan
 Fusa Province, an ancient province in Japan
 Fusa Station, a railway station in Japan

Music
 Fusa, a value in mensural notation corresponding to the modern eighth note
 , the modern Spanish word for a thirty-second note

Animals
 Thallarcha fusa, an Australian moth
 Fossa (animal) (pronounced FOO-sa), a mammal endemic to the island of Madagascar

Other uses
 Fus'ha or fusa, a collective term referring to the standardized, non-spoken varieties of the Arabic language
 Functional safety
 Fairfield University Student Association, a student organization at Fairfield University

See also 
 Fussa